"Dostoevsky and Parricide" is an introductory article contributed by Sigmund Freud to a scholarly collection on the 1880 novel The Brothers Karamazov by Fyodor Dostoyevsky. The collection was published in 1928. The article argues that it is no coincidence that some of the greatest works of world literature – including Oedipus Rex, Hamlet, as well as The Brothers Karamazov – all concern parricide, which in Dostoevsky's case Freud links to his epilepsy.

Ernest Jones termed the piece “Freud's last contribution to the psychology of literature and his most brilliant”; Freud himself however called it “this trivial essay. It was written as a favour for someone and written reluctantly”.

Gambling
The second section of Freud's essay turned away from a primary consideration of  The Brothers Karamazov to consider the related question of Dostoevsky's gambling. Freud saw gambling as a defiant struggle with Fate (concealing the father figure); the associated guilt was the reason for the gambler's compulsion to lose. As Freud himself put it with reference to Dostoyevsky's wife:
”she had noticed that the one thing which offered any real hope of salvation – his literary production – never went better than when they had lost everything....When his sense of guilt was satisfied by the punishments he had inflicted on himself, the inhibition on his work became less severe.”

See also

References

Further reading
F. Dostoevsky, The Gambler (Penguin 1971)
Joseph Frank Dostoevsky (197?) Appendix 379-91

External links
 SLOBODANKA VLADIV-GLOVER - Dostoyevsky, Freud and Parricide; Deconstructive Notes on "The Brothers Karamazov" in New Zealand Slavonic Journal(1993), pp. 7-34
 Freud on Dostoevsky's Epilepsy

1928 essays
Essays about literature
Essays by Sigmund Freud
Homicide
Patricide in fiction
Works about Fyodor Dostoyevsky